The following telephone numbers in Kenya are destination codes for international calls terminating in Kenya as well as the procedures for dialling internationally from within Kenya. Until 1999, Kenya shared its telephone numbering plan with Tanzania and Uganda, meaning that to make calls between the three countries, subscribers needed only dial the area code and number, a legacy of the East African Post and Telecommunications Corporation (EAPTC) which was dissolved in 1977. As a result of the reorganisation of Tanzania's numbering plan in that year, direct dialling was discontinued, although calls between the three countries do not require international dialling, only a special three-digit code.

Land lines
Land line phone numbers in Kenya follow the format Area Code + Phone Number.
To dial a number within an Area and/or City, only the Phone Number needs to be dialled. When dialling from a different Area/City, the telephone number is dialled in the format 0 + Area Code + Phone Number. When dialling from overseas, the 0 is omitted.

List of area codes in Kenya

Mobile operators 
In Kenya there are four mobile network operators (MNO): Safaricom, Airtel (former Zain / Celtel),  Equitel (MVNO)and Telkom Kenya (Orange). The Communications Authority of Kenya (CAK) has assigned several Area Codes to each operator. All mobile Area Codes used the start with the digit 7. As of May 2019, the Communications authority introduced codes starting with the digit 1. Please note: Since April 2011 Mobile number portability (MNP) is implemented in Kenya. The phone number can be ported by the customer to another operator.

Non-geographic numbers
Calls to numbers starting 0800 are free.

Calls to and from Tanzania and Uganda
To call Kenya from Tanzania and Uganda, subscribers must dial 005, followed by the area code and number. To call Uganda from Kenya, subscribers must dial 006, followed by the area code and number, while calls to Tanzania require the prefix 007.

International dialling 
To call Kenya from other countries, subscribers must dial their international access code e.g. 00 for most European countries, and 011 from North America, followed by the country code 254. The international access code for calls from Kenya is 000.

References 

Kenya
Communications in Kenya
Kenya communications-related lists